Jeremy Arlo Lincoln (born April 7, 1969) is an American football cornerback who played eight seasons in the NFL.

Lincoln played football and ran track at DeVilbiss High School (Toledo, Ohio), where he was part of the 1987 Ohio High School state championship track team before attending the University of Tennessee.  He is most famous for the blocked field goal attempt in the last seconds of the Vols' "Miracle in South Bend" victory against Notre Dame where he blocked the field goal with his butt.

References

1969 births
Living people
Sportspeople from Toledo, Ohio
Tennessee Volunteers football players
American football cornerbacks
Chicago Bears players
St. Louis Rams players
Seattle Seahawks players
New York Giants players
Detroit Lions players
Players of American football from Ohio